Chiothion asychis, the white-patched skipper or white patch, is a species of butterfly in the family Hesperiidae. It is found from Argentina, north through tropical America to the West Indies and southern Texas. Strays can be found as far north as southern Arizona, Nevada and Kansas.

The wingspan is 29–38 mm. Three to four generations occur, with adults on wing throughout the year in southern Texas.

The larvae feed on Malpighia glabra in Texas and on Gaudichaudia pentandra in Mexico. Adults feed on flower nectar.

Subspecies
Chiothion asychis asychis - Surinam
Chiothion asychis autander - Argentina
Chiothion asychis georgina - Mexico
Chiothion asychis grenada - Grenada
Chiothion asychis pelagica - Mexico - Baja California Sur
Chiothion asychis simon - Colombia
Chiothion asychis vincenta - St. Vincent
Chiothion asychis zania - Peru

External links
Chiomara asychis georgina at Butterflies and Moths of North America

Erynnini
Butterflies of Central America
Butterflies of the Caribbean
Butterflies of North America
Hesperiidae of South America
Taxa named by Caspar Stoll
Butterflies described in 1780